Aréna Poprad is an indoor sporting arena located in Poprad, Slovakia.  The arena was built in 2006. The capacity of the arena is 1,968 people. The 2010 FIBA Europe Under-18 Championship for Women was the 27th edition of the FIBA Europe Under-18 Championship for Women. 16 teams featured the competition, held in Aréna Poprad, Poprad, Slovakia from July 25–August 8.

FIVB Volleyball World League
The arena was one of the venues at the 2017 editions of the FIVB Volleyball World League, and held the following matches:

2017 FIVB Volleyball World League

|}

References

External links
Arena Poprad Official website, in Slovak

Poprad
Sport in Poprad